Gabrielle Jordão Portilho (born 18 July 1995) is a Brazilian professional footballer who plays as a midfielder for Corinthians.

Club career
In January 2020, Portilho signed for Corinthians. This was the first professional club that she had played for.

References

1995 births
Living people
Women's association football midfielders
Brazilian women's footballers
Sociedade Esportiva Kindermann players
São José Esporte Clube (women) players
Madrid CFF players
Sport Club Corinthians Paulista (women) players
Footballers from Brasília
Campeonato Brasileiro de Futebol Feminino Série A1 players
Brazil women's international footballers